El Omrane Mosque is a mosque in Tunis, Tunisia, located in the El Omrane arrondissement. 
The mosque was constructed in 1935 to accommodate the people of the district.

References

Mosques in Tunis
Mosques completed in 1935